John Richard Lawson (3 February 1925 – 1990) was an English footballer.

Career
Lawson joined York City from Dringhouses in August 1944. He then joined Scarborough.

References

1925 births
Footballers from York
1990 deaths
English footballers
Association football wingers
Dringhouses F.C. players
York City F.C. players
Scarborough F.C. players
English Football League players